Amphitecna latifolia is a species of plant in the family Bignoniaceae from Belize and Costa Rica.

References

External links
 
 

latifolia